The Jackknife (or Jack-knife) Bascule Bridge is a bascule bridge that spans the Kaministiquia River at Thunder Bay, Ontario, Canada, to link the city to Mission Island, one of two islands in the Kaministiquia River delta. The bridge was built by the Canadian Pacific Railway between August 1910 and April 1913. The contractor for the abutments and piers was Alexander Charles Stewart (1867–1944). The bridge had two decks, the lower deck for trains and the upper deck for vehicular road traffic.

The vehicular portion of the bridge was replaced by the Island Drive Bridge, which connects neighbouring McKellar Island to the mainland, in 2003. The connecting roadways and upper deck of the Jackknife Bridge were dismantled in 2004, but the lower deck continues to function as the only rail link to the islands.

See also 
 List of bascule bridges

External links
Photos of the bridge before, during and after demolition of upper deck (in March 2004).

Canadian Pacific Railway bridges in Canada
Railway bridges in Ontario
Bridges completed in 1913
Buildings and structures in Thunder Bay
Bascule bridges
Transport in Thunder Bay
1913 establishments in Ontario